Lachyan is a village in Karnataka State, India.

Lachyan may also refer to Lachin, a town in Azerbaijan.